Peter M. Haas (born January 23, 1955) is a professor of Political Science at the University of Massachusetts Amherst and the Karl Deutsch Visiting Professor at the Wissenschaftszentrum Berlin.

His research concerns epistemic communities, global environmental politics, multilevel governance, and the role of science in global politics.

Haas received his undergraduate education from the University of Michigan and his Ph.D. in 1986 from the Massachusetts Institute of Technology. He has been at Amherst since 1987, and has held visiting positions at Yale University, Brown University, and Oxford University.
His father, Ernst B. Haas, was also a notable political scientist.

Books

Monographs
.
.

Edited volumes
.
.
.
.
.

References

1955 births
Living people
American political scientists
Constructivist international relations scholars
University of Michigan alumni
Massachusetts Institute of Technology alumni
University of Massachusetts Amherst faculty